Events in the year 2023 in Peru.

Incumbents 
 President: 
 Dina Boluarte
 Prime Minister: 
 Alberto Otárola

Events 

 9 January – Juliaca massacre: At least 18 people are killed and over 100 others are injured when the Peruvian National Police fire upon demonstrations in Juliaca.
 10 January – Prime Minister Alberto Otárola imposes a three-day curfew in the Puno region from 8 pm to 4 am (PET) the following day in an effort to repress the protests.
 12 January – 2022–2023 Peruvian protests: The city of Cusco is placed under red alert after clashes between protesters and police leave one dead and 17 injured.
19 January – Thousands of protesters march in Lima demanding the resignation of president Dina Boluarte as the number of fatalities from clashes between demonstrators and police exceeds 50.
21 January – Peru indefinitely closes its iconic Machu Picchu historic site due to the ongoing unrest which has killed dozens of people. Around 500 foreign nationals are currently stranded in Peru. 
28 January – At least 24 people are killed when a bus plunges off a cliff in the El Alto District.
5 February – The government extends the state of emergency in the Apurímac, Arequipa, Cuzco, Madre de Dios, Moquegua, Puno, and Tacna departments until April 7.
7 February – The Peruvian environment ministry reports that the H5N1 influenza A virus has killed 585 sea lions and more than 55,000 birds within its protected areas in "recent weeks".
10 February – The Parliament of Peru approves a motion to file criminal charges against former president Pedro Castillo. The charges include criminal organization, traffic of influences and collusion of power.
11 February – Seven police officers are killed and another is injured when their vehicle is ambushed in Valle de los Ríos Apurímac, Ene y Mantaro, in a suspected attack by remnants of Shining Path.
Scheduled
 10 November – 2 December – 2023 FIFA U-17 World Cup

Deaths
10 March – Tongo, 65, singer and comedian.

References 

 
Peru
Peru
2020s in Peru
Years of the 21st century in Peru